Jeremiah 18 is the eighteenth chapter of the Book of Jeremiah in the Hebrew Bible or the Old Testament of the Christian Bible. This book contains prophecies attributed to the prophet Jeremiah, and is one of the Books of the Prophets. This chapter includes the fourth of the passages known as the "Confessions of Jeremiah".

Text 
The original text of this chapter is written in the Hebrew language. This chapter is divided into 23 verses.

Textual witnesses
Some early manuscripts containing the text of this chapter in Hebrew are of the Masoretic Text tradition, which includes the Codex Cairensis (895), the Petersburg Codex of the Prophets (916), Aleppo Codex (10th century), Codex Leningradensis (1008). Some fragments containing parts of this chapter were found among the Dead Sea Scrolls, i.e., 4QJera (4Q70; 225-175 BCE) with extant verses 15–23.

There is also a translation into Koine Greek known as the Septuagint, made in the last few centuries BCE. Extant ancient manuscripts of the Septuagint version include Codex Vaticanus (B; B; 4th century), Codex Sinaiticus (S; BHK: S; 4th century), Codex Alexandrinus (A; A; 5th century) and Codex Marchalianus (Q; Q; 6th century).

Parashot
The parashah (plural parashot) sections listed here are based on the Aleppo Codex. Jeremiah 18 is a part of the Seventh prophecy (Jeremiah 18-20) in the section of Prophecies of Destruction (Jeremiah 1-25). {P}: open parashah; {S}: closed parashah.
 {P} 18:1-4 {S} 18:5-6 {S} 18:7-8 {S} 18:9-10 {S} 18:11-12 {P} 18:13-17 {S} 18:18-23 {S}

Verse 6
 "O house of Israel, can I not do with you as this potter?" says the Lord.
 "Look, as the clay is in the potter's hand, so are you in My hand, O house of Israel!
 God as the potter and Israel as the clay "underscores God's complete control".

See also

Clay
Israel
Jeremiah
Jerusalem
Judah
Pottery

Related Bible parts: Isaiah 29, Isaiah 45, Isaiah 64, Romans 9, Romans 11

Notes and references

Bibliography

External links

Jewish
Jeremiah 18 Hebrew with Parallel English

Christian
Jeremiah 18 English Translation with Parallel Latin Vulgate

18